This is a bibliography on the history of science and technology in Canada.


Overviews

Nuclear issues
 

 Eggleston, Wilfred, Canada's Nuclear Story *Toronto: Clarke Irwin, 1965)

Technological and industrial
 Avery, Donald H., The Science of War: Canadian Scientists and Allied Military Technology During the Second World War, University of Toronto Press, Toronto, 1998.
 Babaian, Sharon, Radio Communication in Canada: A Historical and Technological Survey, Transformation Series 1, National Museum of Science and Technology, Ottawa, 1992.
 Ball, Norman R., Mind, Heart, and Vision: Professional Engineering in Canada 1887 to 1987, National Museum of Science and Technology/Museums of Canada, Ottawa, 1987.
 Ball, Norman R. ed., Building Canada: A History of Public Works, University of Toronto Press, Toronto, 1988.
 
 Berger, Carl, Science, God, and Nature in Victorian Canada, University of Toronto Press, Toronto, 1983.
 Bliss, Michael, Northern Enterprise: Five Centuries of Canadian Business, McClelland and Stewart, Toronto, 1987.
 Bothwell, Robert, Nucleus: The History of Atomic Energy of Canada Limited, University of Toronto Press, Toronto, 1988.
 Brown, J.J., Ideas in Exile, McClelland and Stewart, Toronto, 1967.
 Bryden, John, Deadly Allies: Canada's Secret War 1937–1947, McClelland & stewart, Toronto, 1989.
 Chisholm, Barbara, ed., Castles of the North: Canada's Grand Hotels, Lynx Images Inc., Toronto, 2001.
 Collins, Robert, A Voice from Afar: The History of Telecommunications in Canada, McGraw-Hill Ryerson, 1977.
 Dewalt, Bryan, Building a Digital Network in Canada: Data Communications and Digital Telephony, 1959–1990, Transformation Series 2, National Museum of Science and Technology, Ottawa, 1992.
 Dewalt, Bryan, Technology and Canadian Printing: A History from Lead Type to Lasers, Transformation Series 3, National Museum of Science and Technology, Ottawa, 1995.
 Eggleston, Wilfred, National Research in Canada: The NRC 1916–1966, Clarke Irwin, Toronto, 1978.
 Faucher, Philippe, Grands projets et innovations technologiques au Canada, Les presses de l'universite de Montréal, Montreal, 1999.
 Germain, Georges-Hebert, Le Genie Québécois: Histoire d'une conquete, Ordre des ingenieurs du Québec/Libre Expression, Montreal, 1995.
 Guillet, Edwin C., The Story of Canadian Roads, University of Toronto Press, Toronto, 1967.
 Harry, J., Smith, G., Lessard, Gilles, Forestry Resources Research in Canada, Science Council of Canada, Ottawa 1971.
 Hopps, John A., Passing Pulses: The Pacemaker and Medical Engineering: A Canadian Story, Publishing Plus Limited, Ottawa, 1995.
 Knowles Middleton, W.E., Radar Development in Canada: The Radio Branch of the National Research Council of Canada, 1939–1946, Wilfrid Laurier University Press, Waterloo, Ontario, 1981.
 Koppel, Ted, Powering the Future: the Ballard Fuel Cell and the Race to Change the World, John Wiley & Sons, Etobicoke, 1999.
 Lowther, William, Arms and the Man: Dr. Gerald Bull, Iraq and the Supergun, Doubleday Canada Limites, Toronto, 1991.
 MacDermot, H.E., One Hundred Years of Medicine in Canada 1867–1967, McClelland and Stewart, Toronto, 1967.
 Macpherson, Burgess, The Ships of Canada's Naval Forces 1910–1985, Collins, Toronto, 1981.
 McDonnell, The History of Canadian Railroads, New Burlington Books, London, 1985.
 McGrath, T.M., History of Canadian Airports, Lugus Publications, Ottawa, 1992.
 Madger, Ted, Canada's Hollywood: The Canadian State and Feature Films, University of Toronto Press, Toronto, 1993.
 Maginley, Collin, The Ships of Canada's Marine Services, Vanwell, St. Catharines, 2001.
 Mayer, Roy, Inventing Canada: One Hundred Years of Innovation, Raincoast Books, Vancouver, 1997.
 Mayer, Roy, Scientific Canadian: Invention and Innovation from Canada's national Research Council, Raincoast Books, Vancouver, 1999.
 Milberry, Larry, Aviation in Canada, McGraw-Hill Ryerson, Toronto, 1979.
 Millard, J. Rodney, The Master Spirit of the Age: Canadian Engineers and the Politics of Professionalism 1887–1922, University of Toronto Press, Toronto, 1988.
 Morton, Desmond, A Military History of Canada, Hurtig, Edmonton, 1990.
 Mouat, Jeremy, Metal Mining in Canada, 1840 −1950, Transformation Series 9, National Museum of Science and Technology, Ottawa, 2000.
 Muise, McIntosh, Coal Mining in Canada: A Historical and Comparative Overview, Transformation Series 5, National Museum of Science and Technology, Ottawa, 1996.
 Robertson, Heather, Driving Force, The McLaughlin Family and the Age of the Car, McClelland & Stewart, Toronto, 1995.
 Silversides, C.Ross, Broadaxe to Flying Shear: the Mechanization of Forest Harvesting East of the Rockies, Transformation Series 6, National Museum of Science and Technology, Ottawa, 1997.
 Smallman, B.N., et al., Agriculture Science in Canada, Science Council of Canada, Ottawa, 1970.
 Stewart, R.W., Dickie, L.M., Ad Mare: Canada Looks to the Sea—A Study on Marine Science and Technology, Science Council of Canada, Ottawa 1971.
 Süsskind, Charles. "technology." Grolier Multimedia Encyclopedia. 2008. Grolier Online. 23 Oct. 2008 
 Taylor, Baskerville, A Concise Business History of Canada, Oxford University Press, Toronto, 1994.
 Thomson, Don W., Men and Mericians Volumes 1,2,3, Information Canada, Ottawa, 1966.
 Thomson, Malcolm, M., The Beginning of the Long Dash: A History of Timekeeping in Canada, University of Toronto Press, Toronto, 1978.
 Tremblay, Robert, Histoire des outils manuels au Canada de 1828 a 1960, Transformation Series 10, National Museum of Science and Technology, Ottawa, 2001.
 Warrington, Newbold, Chemical Canada: Past and Present, The Chemical Institute of Canada, Ottawa, 1970.
 Weir, E. Austin, The Struggle for National Broadcasting in Canada, McClelland & Stewart, Toronto, 1965.
 Westman, A.E.R., Chemistry and Chemical Engineering: A Survey of Research and Development in Canada, The Science Council of Canada, Ottawa, 1969.
 Wilson, Andrew, Background to Invention, Science Council of Canada, 1970.
 Wilson, Andrew, Research Councils in the Provinces: A Canadian Resource, Science Council of Canada, Ottawa, 1971.
 Wilson, Garth, A History of Shipbuilding and Naval Architecture in Canada, Transformation Series 4, National Museum of Science and Technology, Ottawa, 1994.
 Williams, Michael, Massey Ferguson Tractors, Blandford Press, London, 1987.
 Wright, J.W., A History of the Native Peoples of Canada: Volumes I(2001) & II(1999), Canadian Museum of Civilization, Ottawa.
 Zeller, Suzanne, Inventing Canada: Early Victorian Science and the Idea of a Transcontinental Nation, University of Toronto Press, Toronto, 1987.
 Scientia Canadensis

Natural scientific research
 Ainley, Marianne Gosztonyi, ed., Despite All Odds: Essays on Canadian Women and Science, Vehicle Press, Montreal, 1990.
 Anstey, T.H., One Hundred Harvests: Research Branch Agriculture Canada 1886–1986, Research Branch Agriculture Canada, Historical Series No. 27, 1986.
 Appley, M.H., Rickwood, Jean, Psychology in Canada, Science Secretariat, Ottawa, 1967.
 Avery, Donald H., The Science of War: Canadian Scientists and Allied Military Technology During the Second World War, University of Toronto Press, Toronto, 1998.
 Babbitt, J.D. ed., Science in Canada: Selections from the Speeches of Dr. E.W.R. Steacie, University of Toronto Press, Toronto, 1965.
 Beltzner, Klaus P., Coleman, A. John, Edwards, Gordon G., Mathematical Sciences in Canada, Science Council of Canada, ottawa, 1976.
 Berger, Carl, Science, God, and Nature in Victorian Canada, University of Toronto Press, Toronto, 1983.
 Berger, Carl, Honour and the Search for Influence: A History of the Royal Society of Canada, University of Toronto Press, Toronto, 1996.
 Bliss, Michael, Northern Enterprise: Five Centuries of Canadian Business, McClelland and Stewart, Toronto, 1987.
 Bothwell, Robert, Nucleus: The History of Atomic Energy of Canada Limited, University of Toronto Press, Toronto, 1988.
 Bryden, John, Best-Kept Secret: Canadian Secret Intelligence in the Second World War, Lester Publishing, Toronto, 1993.
 Bryden, John, Deadly Allies: Canada's Secret War 1937–1947, McClelland & stewart, Toronto, 1989.
 Chapman, J.H., et al., Upper Atmosphere and Space Programmes in Canada, Science Secretariat, Ottawa, 1967.
 Chartrand, Duchesne, Gingras, Histoire des sciences au Québec, Boreal, Montreal, 1987.
 Doern, G. Bruce, Science and Politics in Canada, McGill-Queen's University Press, Toronto, 1972.
 Duchesne, R., La science et le pouvoir au Québec, Editeur officiel du Québec, Quebec, 1978.
 Eggleston, Wilfred, National Research in Canada: The NRC 1916–1966, Clarke Irwin, Toronto, 1978.
 Edmonds, Alan, Voyage to the Edge of the World, McClelland and Stewart, Toronto, 1973.
 Fillmore, Peter ed., Canadian Mathematical Society 1945–1995: Volume I—Mathematics in Canada, Canadian Mathematical Society, Ottawa, 1995.
 Gingras, Yves, Les origines de la recherche scientifique au Canada: Le cas des physiciens, Boreal, Montreal, 1991.
 Gingras, Yves, Pour l'avancement des sciences, Histoire de l'ACFAS 1923–1993, Boreal, Montreal, 1994.
 Gillmor, Don, I Swear By Apollo: Dr Ewen Cameron and the CIA-Brainwashing Experiments, Eden Press, Montreal, 1987.
 Harris, Robin, A History of Higher Education in Canada: 1663–1960, University of Toronto Press, Toronto, 1976.
 Harry, J., Smith, G., Lessard, Gilles, Forestry Resources Research in Canada, Science Council of Canada, Ottawa 1971.
 Hayes, F. Ronald, The Chaining of Prometheus: Evolution of a Power Structure for Canadian Science, University of Toronto Press, Toronto, 1973.
 Hopps, John A., Passing Pulses: The Pacemaker and Medical Engineering: A Canadian Story, Publishing Plus Limited, Ottawa, 1995.
 Jarrell, Richard, The Cold Light of Dawn: A History of Canadian Astronomy, University of Toronto Press, Toronto, 1988.
 Johnstone, Kenneth, The Aquatic Explorers: A History of the Fisheries Research Board of Canada, Fisheries Research Board/University of Toronto Press, Toronto, 1977.
 King, Christine, E.W.R. Steacie and Science in Canada, University of Toronto Press, Toronto, 1989.
 Knowles Middleton, W.E., Physics at the National Research Council of Canada, Wilfrid Laurier University Press, Waterloo, Ontario, 1979.
 Knowles Middleton, W.E., Radar Development in Canada: The Radio Branch of the National Research Council of Canada, 1939–1946, Wilfrid Laurier University Press, Waterloo, Ontario, 1981.
 Kruus, P., Basic Research, Science Council of Canada, Ottawa, 1971.
 Lamontagne, Maurice, Une politique scientifique canadienne, Volume I—Une analyse critique: Le passe et le present, Information Canada, Ottawa, 1971.
 Levere, Jarrell, A Curious Field Book: Science and Society in Canadian History, Oxford University Press, Toronto, 1974.
 Lithwick, Canada's Science Policy, Methuen, Toronto, 1969.
 MacDermot, H.E., One Hundred Years of Medicine in Canada 1867–1967, McClelland and Stewart, Toronto, 1967.
 OECD, Reviews of National Science Policy: Canada, OECD Publications, Paris, 1969.
 Ouellet, Cyrias, La vie des sciences au Canada Francais, Ministere des Affaires culturelles, Quebec, 1964.
 Rose, D.C. er al., Physics in Canada: Survey and Outlook, Science Secretariat, Ottawa, 1967.
 Royal Society of Canada, Fifty Years Retrospect, Canada 1882–1932, The Ryerson Press, Toronto, 1932.
 Smallman, B.N., et al., Agriculture Science in Canada, Science Council of Canada, Ottawa, 1970.
 Spalding, David, Into the Dinosaurs' Graveyard, Doubleday Canada, Toronto, 1999.
 Stewart, R.W., Dickie, L.M., Ad Mare: Canada Looks to the Sea—A Study on Marine Science and Technology, Science Council of Canada, Ottawa 1971.
 Taylor, Baskerville, A Concise Business History of Canada, Oxford University Press, Toronto, 1994.
 Thomson, Don W., Men and Mericians Volumes 1,2,3, Information Canada, Ottawa, 1966.
 Thomson, Malcolm, M., The Beginning of the Long Dash: A History of Timekeeping in Canada, University of Toronto Press, Toronto, 1978.
 Thistle, Mel, The Inner Ring: The Early History of the National Research Council of Canada, University of Toronto Press, Toronto, 1966.
 Wallace, W. Stewart ed., The Royal Canadian Institute Centennial Volume 1849–1949, Royal Canadian Institute, Toronto, 1949.
 Warrington, Newbold, Chemical Canada: Past and Present, The Chemical Institute of Canada, Ottawa, 1970.
 Westman, A.E.R., Chemistry and Chemical Engineering: A Survey of Research and Development in Canada, The Science Council of Canada, Ottawa, 1969.
 Wilson, Andrew, Research Councils in the Provinces: A Canadian Resource, Science Council of Canada, Ottawa, 1971.
 Zaslow, Morris, Reading the Rocks: The Story of the Geological Survey of Canada 1842–1972, Macmillan of Canada, Toronto, 1975.
 Zeller, Suzanne, Inventing Canada: Early Victorian Science and the Idea of a Transcontinental Nation, University of Toronto Press, Toronto, 1987.

Invention
 Ainley, Marianne Gosztonyi, ed., Despite All Odds: Essays on Canadian Women and Science, Vehicle Press, Montreal, 1990.
 Anstey, T.Branch Agriculture Canada, Historical Series No. 27, 1986.
 Avery, Donald H., The Science of War: Canadian Scientists and Allied Military Technology During the Second World War, University of Toronto Press, Toronto, 1998.
 Babaian, Sharon, Radio Communication in Canada: A Historical and Technological Survey, Transformation Series 1, National Museum of Science and Technology, Ottawa, 1992.
 Babbitt, J.D. ed., Science in Canada: Selections from the Speeches of Dr. E.W.R. Steacie, University of Toronto Press, Toronto, 1965.
 Ball, Norman R., Mind, Heart, and Vision: Professional Engineering in Canada 1887 to 1987, National Museum of Science and Technology/Museums of Canada, Ottawa, 1987.
 Ball, Norman R. ed., Building Canada: A History of Public Works, University of Toronto Press, Toronto, 1988.
 Barris, Theodore, Fire Canoe: Prairie Steamboat Days Revisited, McClelland and Stewart, Toronto, 1977.
 Berger, Carl, Science, God, and Nature in Victorian Canada, University of Toronto Press, Toronto, 1983.
 Bothwell, Robert, Nucleus: The History of Atomic Energy of Canada Limited, University of Toronto Press, Toronto, 1988.
 Brown, J.J., Ideas in Exile, McClelland and Stewart, Toronto, 1967.
 Bryden, John, Deadly Allies: Canada's Secret War 1937 - 1947, McClelland & stewart, Toronto, 1989.
 Chapman, J.H., et al., Upper Atmosphere and Space Programmes in Canada, Science Secretariat, Ottawa, 1967.
 Collins, Robert, A Voice from Afar: The History of Telecommunications in Canada, McGraw-Hill Ryerson, 1977.
 Dewalt, Bryan, Building a Digital Network in Canada: Data Communications and Digital Telephony, 1959-1990, Transformation Series 2, National Museum of Science and Technology, Ottawa, 1992.
 Dewalt, Bryan, Technology and Canadian Printing: A History from Lead Type to Lasers, Transformation Series 3, National Museum of Science and Technology, Ottawa, 1995.
 Eggleston, Wilfred, National Research in Canada: The NRC 1916 - 1966, Clarke Irwin, Toronto, 1978.
 Faucher, Philippe, Grands projets et innovations technologiques au Canada, Les presses de l'université de Montréal, Montreal, 1999.
 Germain, Georges-Hebert, Le Génie Québécois: Histoire d'une conquête, Ordre des ingénieurs du Québec/Libre Expression, Montreal, 1995.
 Guillet, Edwin C., The Story of Canadian Roads, University of Toronto Press, Toronto, 1967.
 Harry, J., Smith, G., Lessard, Gilles, Forestry Resources Research in Canada, Science Council of Canada, Ottawa 1971.
 Hopps, John A., Passing Pulses: The Pacemaker and Medical Engineering: A Canadian Story, Publishing Plus Limited, Ottawa, 1995.
 Knowles Middleton, W.E., Radar Development in Canada: The Radio Branch of the National Research Council of Canada, 1939-1946, Wilfrid Laurier University Press, Waterloo, Ontario, 1981.
 Koppel, Ted, Powering the Future: the Ballard Fuel Cell and the Race to Change the World, John Wiley & Sons, Etobicoke, 1999.
 Lowther, William, Arms and the Man: Dr. Gerald Bull, Iraq and the Supergun, Doubleday Canada Limites, Toronto, 1991.
 MacDermot, H.E., One Hundred Years of Medicine in Canada 1867-1967, McClelland and Stewart, Toronto, 1967.
 Macpherson, Burgess, The Ships of Canada's Naval Forces 1910-1985, Collins, Toronto, 1981.
 McDonnell, The History of Canadian Railroads, New Burlington Books, London, 1985.
 McGrath, T.M., History of Canadian Airports, Lugus Publications, Ottawa, 1992.
 Madger, Ted, Canada's Hollywood: The Canadian State and Feature Films, University of Toronto Press, Toronto, 1993.
 Maginley, Collin, The Ships of Canada's Marine Services, Vanwell, St. Catharines, 2001.
 Mayer, Roy, Inventing Canada: One Hundred Years of Innovation, Raincoast Books, Vancouver, 1997.
 Mayer, Roy, Scientific Canadian: Invention and Innovation from Canada's national Research Council, Raincoast Books, Vancouver, 1999.
 Milberry, Larry, Aviation in Canada, McGraw-Hill Ryerson, Toronto, 1979.
 Millard, J. Rodney, The Master Spirit of the Age: Canadian Engineers and the Politics of Professionalism 1887 - 1922, University of Toronto Press, Toronto, 1988.
 Morton, Desmond, A Military History of Canada, Hurtig, Edmonton, 1990.
 Mouat, Jeremy, Metal Mining in Canada, 1840–1950, Transformation Series 9, National Museum of Science and Technology, Ottawa, 2000.
 Muise, McIntosh, Coal Mining in Canada: A Historical and Comparative Overview, Transformation Series 5, National Museum of Science and Technology, Ottawa, 1996.
 OECD, Reviews of National Science Policy: Canada, OECD Publications, Paris, 1969.
 Robertson, Heather, Driving Force, The McLaughlin Family and the Age of the Car, McClelland & Stewart, Toronto, 1995.
 Silversides, C.Ross, Broadaxe to Flying Shear: the Mechanization of Forest Harvesting East of the Rockies, Transformation Series 6, National Museum of Science and Technology, Ottawa, 1997.
 Smallman, B.N., et al., Agriculture Science in Canada, Science Council of Canada, Ottawa, 1970.
 Stewart, R.W., Dickie, L.M., Ad Mare: Canada Looks to the Sea - A Study on Marine Science and Technology, Science Council of Canada, Ottawa 1971.
 Taylor, Baskerville, A Concise Business History of Canada, Oxford University Press, Toronto, 1994.
 Thomson, Malcolm, M., The Beginning of the Long Dash: A History of Timekeeping in Canada, University of Toronto Press, Toronto, 1978.
 Tremblay, Robert, Histoire des outils manuels au Canada de 1828 a 1960, Transformation Series 10, National Museum of Science and Technology, Ottawa, 2001.
 Warrington, Newbold, Chemical Canada: Past and Present, The Chemical Institute of Canada, Ottawa, 1970.
 Weir, E. Austin, The Struggle for National Broadcasting in Canada, McClelland & Stewart, Toronto, 1965.
 Westman, A.E.R., Chemistry and Chemical Engineering: A Survey of Research and Development in Canada, The Science Council of Canada, Ottawa, 1969.
 Wilson, Andrew, Background to Invention, Science Council of Canada, 1970.
 Wilson, Andrew, Research Councils in the Provinces: A Canadian Resource, Science Council of Canada, Ottawa, 1971.
 Wilson, Garth, A History of Shipbuilding and Naval Architecture in Canada, Transformation Series 4, National Museum of Science and Technology, Ottawa, 1994.
 Williams, Michael, Massey Ferguson Tractors, Blandford Press, London, 1987.
 Zeller, Suzanne, Inventing Canada: Early Victorian Science and the Idea of a Transcontinental Nation, University of Toronto Press, Toronto, 1987.

See also

Bibliography of Canada
Lists of books
List of bibliographies
Lists of important publications in science

External links 
Science and Technology for Canadians - Government of Canada
Canada Science and Technology Museum - Government of Canada
 Canadian Institute for Advanced Research: Science
 Canadian Encyclopedia: Science

Science and technology in Canada
Canada